James "Jim" Latos (born January 4, 1966 in Wakaw, Saskatchewan) is a former professional ice hockey coach and player. He coached the Wichita Thunder of the Central Hockey League from 2001-2003.

Career statistics

See also
List of players who played only one game in the NHL

External links

1966 births
Living people
New York Rangers players
People from Wakaw, Saskatchewan
Undrafted National Hockey League players
Wichita Thunder coaches
Wichita Thunder players
Canadian ice hockey right wingers